Paludinella is a genus of minute salt marsh snails with an operculum, aquatic gastropod mollusks or micromollusks, in the family Assimineidae.

Species
The genus Paludinella contains the following species:
 † Paludinella aperta Stache, 1889 
 Paludinella conica 
 Paludinella corpulenta (van Benthem Jutting, 1963)
 Paludinella debilis (Gould, 1859)
 Paludinella globularis (Hanley in Thorpe, 1844) 
 Paludinella halophila B. Rensch, 1934
 Paludinella hidalgoi (Gassies, 1869)
 † Paludinella incerta Stache, 1889 
 Paludinella kuiperi Brandt, 1974
 Paludinella kuzuuensis Suzuki, 1937
 Paludinella minima Habe, 1942
 Paludinella miyakoinsularis Minato, 1980
 Paludinella rubida (Gould, 1859)
 Paludinella semperi 
 Paludinella sicana (Brugnone, 1876)
 Paludinella solomonensis Dell, 1955
 Paludinella stricta (Gould, 1859)
 Paludinella taiwanensis Habe, 1942
 Paludinella tanegashimae (Pilsbry, 1924)
 Paludinella thonburi Brandt, 1968
 Paludinella vitrea 

Species brought into synonymy
 Paludinella (Bythinella): synonym of Bythinella Moquin-Tandon, 1856
 Paludinella (Bythiospeum) Bourguignat, 1882: synonym of Bythiospeum Bourguignat, 1882
 Paludinella (Paludinella) L. Pfeiffer, 1841: synonym of Paludinella L. Pfeiffer, 1841
 Paludinella (Pseudamnicola): synonym of Pseudamnicola Paulucci, 1878
 Paludinella (Rupacilla) Thiele, 1927: synonym of Rupacilla Thiele, 1927 (original rank)
 Paludinella (Schuettiella) Brandt, 1974: synonym of Schuettiella Brandt, 1974 (original rank)
 Paludinella anianensis Paladilhe, 1870: synonym of Bythinella cebennensis (Dupuy, 1851)
 Paludinella armoricana Paladilhe, 1869: synonym of Marstoniopsis armoricana (Paladilhe, 1869) (original combination)
 Paludinella austriaca Frauenfeld, 1856: synonym of Bythinella austriaca (Frauenfeld, 1856) (original combination)
 Paludinella cyclothyra O. Boettger, 1869 †: synonym of Bythinella cyclothyra (O. Boettger, 1869) † (new combination)
 Paludinella daengsvangi Brandt, 1968: synonym of Schuettiella daengsvangi (Brandt, 1968) (original combination)
 Paludinella daitoensis Habe, 1942: synonym of Paludinellassiminea daitoensis (Habe, 1942) (original combination)
 Paludinella dunkeri Frauenfeld, 1857: synonym of Bythinella dunkeri (Frauenfeld, 1857) (original combination)
 Paludinella elliptica Paladilhe, 1874: synonym of Alzoniella elliptica (Paladilhe, 1874) (original combination)
 Paludinella eurystoma Paladilhe, 1870: synonym of Bythinella eurystoma (Paladilhe, 1870) (original combination)
 Paludinella fontinalis F. J. Schmidt, 1847: synonym of Belgrandiella fontinalis (F. J. Schmidt, 1847) (original combination)
 Paludinella gilesi Angas, 1877: synonym of Coxiella gilesi (Angas, 1877) (original combination)
 Paludinella japonica (Pilsbry, 1901): synonym of Paludinellassiminea japonica (Pilsbry, 1901)
 Paludinella javana Thiele, 1927: synonym of Taiwanassiminea javana (Thiele, 1927) (original combination)
 Paludinella kobelti Westerlund, 1892: synonym of Mercuria kobelti (Westerlund, 1892) (original combination)
 Paludinella littorina auct. non delle Chiaje, 1828: synonym of Paludinella globularis (Hanley in Thorpe, 1844)
 Paludinella littorina (delle Chiaje, 1828): synonym of Melarhaphe neritoides (Linnaeus, 1758)
 Paludinella newcombiana Hemphill, 1877: synonym of Littorina subrotundata (Carpenter, 1864)
Notes: Kadolsky (2012) has showed that the real Helix littorina delle Chiaje, 1828, was most probably based on small specimens of Melarhaphe neritoides (Linnaeus, 1758). However, Pfeiffer (1841) based the genus Paludinella on the taxonomic extension given to that name by Philippi (1836), i.e. a misidentified type species. For Paludinella littorina of authors, non delle Chiaje, Kadolsky restored the name Paludinella globularis and, under Art. 70.3 of the code of the International Commission on Zoological Nomenclature, designated the latter as type species of Paludinella.
 Paludinella scalaris Slavík, 1869 †: synonym of Bythinella (Bythinella) scalaris (Slavík, 1869) † (new combination)
 Paludinella servainiana Paladilhe, 1870: synonym of Bythinella servainiana (Paladilhe, 1870) (original combination)
 Paludinella yamamotonis Minato, 1973: synonym of Cavernacmella yamamotonis (Minato, 1973) (original combination)

References

 Nomenclator Zoologicus info
 Pfeiffer, L. (1841). Beiträge zur Molluskenfauna Deutschlands, insbesondere der österreichischen Staaten. Archiv für Naturgeschichte. Berlin. 7 (1): 215-230.
 Gofas, S.; Le Renard, J.; Bouchet, P. (2001). Mollusca, in: Costello, M.J. et al. (Ed.) (2001). European register of marine species: a check-list of the marine species in Europe and a bibliography of guides to their identification. Collection Patrimoines Naturels, 50: pp. 180–213
 Kadolsky D. (2012) Nomenclatural comments on non-marine molluscs occurring in the British Isles. Journal of Conchology 41(1): 65-90.

External links 
AnimalBase info

 
Assimineidae
Taxonomy articles created by Polbot
Taxa named by Ludwig Karl Georg Pfeiffer
Gastropod genera